Jackson Township is one of thirteen townships in Putnam County, Indiana. As of the 2010 census, its population was 854 and it contained 376 housing units.

Geography

Cities and towns
 Roachdale (partial)

Unincorporated towns
 Barnard at 
 New Maysville at 
(This list is based on USGS data and may include former settlements.)

References

External links
 Indiana Township Association
 United Township Association of Indiana

Townships in Putnam County, Indiana
Townships in Indiana